Sundalm is an administrative unit, known as Union Council, of Upper Dir District in the Khyber Pakhtunkhwa province of Pakistan.

Upper Dir is administratively subdivided into six tehsils which contain a total of 28 Union Councils. Upper Dir is represented in the National Assembly, and Provincial Assembly by one elected MNA and three elected MPAs respectively.

See also 

 Upper Dir District

External links
Khyber-Pakhtunkhwa Government website section on Lower Dir
United Nations
Hajjinfo.org Uploads
 PBS paiman.jsi.com

Upper Dir District
Populated places in Upper Dir District
Union Councils of Upper Dir District